Chhatrapati Sambhaji Raje International Airport is a proposed greenfield airport project to serve the city of Pune, India. It will be built near Saswad and Jejuri in Purandar taluka of Pune District in the Indian state of Maharashtra. In 2016, it was announced that the proposed airport would be spread over 2,400 hectares. The airport would be named after the King of Maratha Empire, Sambhaji Maharaj, who was born at Purandar fort. 

The CIDCO will hold a 51 percent stake in the SPV, while MADC's stake will be around 19 percent. The remaining 30 percent will be divided between the Maharashtra Industrial Development Corporation (MIDC) and Pune Metropolitan Region Development Authority (PMRDA). The Airports Authority of India conducted surveys on various areas near Pune for a new airport for the city. Initially, a site near Chakan was fixed for the airport but due to opposition from local farmers and the mountainous terrain, the government decided to build the new airport in Purandar taluka as it was a flatter region compared to Chakan. This airport will also boost trade from Pune and neighboring districts as it will have its own dedicated cargo terminal.

Background 

Lohagaon Air Force Station serves as the main passenger airport for the city of Pune. Due to its status as a "restricted international airport," only two to four international flights can operate from there. Moreover, it is an Air Force base and has a single civil terminal which operates both international as well as domestic traffic.

Almost 65 to 70 flights operate connecting major domestic destinations. This is crowding the existing airport and leading to flight delays as the airport has only eight parking bays. Of those, one is used for VIP's and another is used for charter operations. The remaining parking bays carry the load of international as well as domestic flights. Hence, this led to the need for a dedicated international airport for the city as Pune is one of the fastest-growing cities in India and is included in the Smart City program of the Indian government. However, until completion of the new international airport, the existing airport will be expanded with a second terminal.

Connection
The project site is located near the villages of Ambodi, Sonori, Kumbharvalan, Ekhatpur-Munjawadi, Khanwadi, Pargaon Memane, Rajewadi, Aamble, Tekwadi, Vanpuri, Udachiwadi, and Singapur. Rajewadi railway station on the Pune–Miraj–Lonand line is nearest to the site. The proposed airport will be connected with six different routes including national highways 48 and 65. There will also be a special ring-road connecting major industrial establishments with the proposed airport from Hadapsar.

Proposed Airport Structure 

The new Pune International Airport, which is set to come up at Purandar, will serve as a cargo hub for the state. There are many farmers in nearby areas like Satara who cultivate fruits like grapes and pomegranates, among other crops. With the new airport and the state-of-the-art cargo, their crops can be easily transported to other states and countries globally. At present, Maharashtra does not have a good cargo network. A proper cargo hub is expected to increase state revenue as exports can be smoothly processed as well as create new job opportunities.

References

External links
 Proposed Pune international airport will be named after Chhatrapati Sambhaji

Proposed airports in Maharashtra
Airports in Pune district
Buildings and structures in Pune
Planned transport for Pune
Proposed infrastructure in Maharashtra
Transport in Pune